Jung Soo-Keun (Hangul: 정수근, Hanja: 鄭守根) (born January 20, 1977 in Seoul, South Korea) is a retired South Korean baseball player who played for the Doosan Bears and Lotte Giants of the Korea Baseball Organization. Jung won four consecutive stolen bases titles (-) in the KBO league. Over his career he compiled 474 stolen bases, a .280 batting average and 866 runs in 1544 games. His 474 stolen bases rank 4th behind Jeon Jun-Ho, Lee Jong-Beom, and Lee Dae-hyung.

Professional career 

In , Jung was part of the South Korea national baseball team which won the bronze medal in the baseball tournament of the 2000 Summer Olympics in Sydney, Australia.

Notable international careers

Legal troubles 
In February 2003, Jung was arrested in Honolulu, Hawaii on charges of battery after slashing two men in a Korean restaurant when he was joining the Doosan Bears spring training camp.

On July 26, 2004, Jung was arrested on assault charges for hitting a man with a baseball bat in Haeundae-gu, Busan. He was arrested again on July 16, 2008 for allegedly punching two security guards and a policeman in Busan.

On August 31, 2009, Jung was involved in an altercation at a Karaoke club in Busan. The police was dispatched to the site after receiving a report that he was half-naked, intoxicated and swearing in a karaoke room, but Jung was not arrested. However, due to the controversy, he was released from the Lotte Giants on September 1, 2009. On September 15, 2009, Jung made an official announcement as to his retirement.

At approximately 4:40 A.M. on June 13, 2010, Jung was involved in a car crash at the intersection in front of Renaissance Seoul Hotel in Seoul where his BMW car crashed into another car. Because his breathalyzer test revealed a blood alcohol level of 0.12 percent, authorities arrested Jung at the scene for misdemeanor drunk driving.

External links 
 Career statistics and player information from the KBO official website
 Databaseolympics

Baseball players at the 2000 Summer Olympics
Olympic bronze medalists for South Korea
Olympic baseball players of South Korea
Lotte Giants players
Doosan Bears players
KBO League center fielders
South Korean baseball players
1977 births
Living people
Olympic medalists in baseball
Medalists at the 2000 Summer Olympics
Baseball players from Seoul